Villehardouin was a noble dynasty that originated in Villehardouin, a former commune of the Aube department, now part of Val-d'Auzon, France. It is most notable as the ruling house of the Principality of Achaea, a Frankish crusader state in the Peloponnese peninsula of Greece, between 1209 and 1278, when possession passed to the Angevin Kings of Naples.

Notable Family Members 

 Vilain of Villehardouin (died before 1170)
 John of Villehardouin (died after 1216), Lord of Villehardouin
 Geoffrey I of Villehardouin (ca. 1169–1229/31), helped William of Champlitte conquer the Morea, Prince of Achaea in 1209–1229/31; married Elisabeth (de Chappes?)
 Geoffrey II of Villehardouin (c. 1194-1246), Prince of Achaea in 1229/31–1246; married Agnes of Courtenay
 William II of Villehardouin (1211–1278), Prince of Achaea in 1246–1278; married unnamed daughter of Narjot of Toucy, Carintana dalle Carceri (died 1255); Anna Komnene Doukaina (died 1286)
 Isabella of Villehardouin (1260/63–1312), Princess of Achaea in 1289–1307; married Philip of Sicily (died 1277), Florent of Hainaut (died 1297), Philip of Savoy (died 1334)
 Matilda of Hainaut (died 1331), Lady of Kalamata in 1297–1308, 1311–1322, Princess of Achaea in 1313–1318; married Guy II de la Roche (died 1308), Louis of Burgundy (died 1316), John of Gravina (died 1336), (secretly) Hugh de la Palisse
 Margaret of Villehardouin (1266–1315), Lady of Akova; married Isnard of Sabran (died 1297), Richard Orsini (died 1303/4)
 Isabella of Sabran (1297–1315), married Infante Ferdinand of Majorca (died 1316)
 Theodore of Villehardouin, Patriarch of Antioch known as Theodose V
 unnamed daughter (?Alice), married Hugh of Briel, Lord of Karytaina
 Eremburge of Villehardouin, married de Bernard de Montbar
 unknown
 Eudes, Bishop of Coron before 1209
 Roscelin of Villehardouin (died before 1170), Canon of Saint-Etienne Church in Troyes
 Vilain of Villehardouin, vice-dean of Saint-Etienne Church in Troyes, excommunicated 1192
 Geoffrey of Villehardouin (died before 1218), Marshal of the Champagne, participant in the Fourth Crusade, Marshal of the Latin Empire, and author of the Chronicle of The Fourth Crusade and The Conquest of Constantinople
 Erard I of Villy (died 1224), Lord of Lézinnes, of Villehardouin etc.
 William I of Lézinnes (died 1246), Marschal of the Champagne
 Erard II of Lézinnes (died 1279), Bishop of Auxerre, Cardinal and Bishop of Palestrina in 1276–1279
 William II of Lézinnes (died 1264)
 Isabeau (died after 1299); married Walter IV of Châtillon (died 1261)
 Mary of Villehardouin, married Ascelin de Merry
 Alix of Villehardouin (died 1249) also called Adelaide, abbess of Abbey of Notre Dame aux Nonnains in Troyes
 Geoffroi of Villehardouin
 Dameron of Villehardouin, abbess of Foissy abbey
 Emeline of Villehardouin, abbess of Montier-en-l'Isle (1232)
 Haice of Villehardouin, nun at Foissy abbey
 Gui of Villehardouin (died before 1223), also called la Grive, Lord of Villevoques
 Gautier of Villehardouin

Sources 
 
 
 

 
Villehardouin